The Cod Grounds Marine Park (formerly known as the Cod Grounds Commonwealth Marine Reserve) is an Australian marine park located approximately 5.5 km offshore of New South Wales, near Laurieton. It is one of 8 parks managed under the Temperate East Marine Parks Network.

Conservation values
Established 2007 to protect a significant aggregation site for the critically endangered east coast population of grey nurse sharks. The area is characterised by a series of underwater pinnacles.
Biologically important areas for the protected humpback whale, vulnerable white shark and a number of migratory seabirds.
Examples of the ecosystems of the Central Eastern Shelf Province provincial bioregion and the Manning Shelf meso-scale bioregion.

History
The Marine Park was originally proclaimed on 10 May 2007 as the  Cod Grounds Commonwealth Marine Reserve. The name of the reserve was later changed to Cod Grounds Marine Park on 9 October 2017.

Summary of protection zones
The Cod Grounds Marine park has been assigned IUCN protected area category II and is wholly zoned as a National Park.

The following table is a summary of the zoning rules within the Cod Grounds Marine Park:

See also

 Protected areas managed by the Australian government

References

External links
 Temperate East Marine Parks Network - Parks Australia
 Temperate East Marine Parks Network - environment.gov.au (outdated)

Australian marine parks